The Quiquijana District is one of the twelve districts in the Quispicanchi Province in Peru. Its capital is the town of Quiquijana.

Geography 
The most important river of the district is the Willkanuta which crosses the district from south-east to north-west.

Other mountains are listed below:

Ethnic groups 
The people in the district are mainly indigenous citizens of Quechua descent. Quechua is the language which the majority of the population (88.42%) learnt to speak in childhood, 11.25% of the residents started speaking using the Spanish language (2007 Peru Census).

References  

  Instituto Nacional de Estadística e Informática. Departamento Cusco. Retrieved on November 2, 2007.